Charles Francis McAfee,  (born December 25, 1932), is an American architect, building material manufacturer, and housing activist. He was the founding president of Charles F. McAfee Architects, Engineers, and Planners firm (now McAfee) which was headquartered in Wichita, Kansas. McAfee has had a distinguished career, and has been considered one of the most important African-American architect in the United States for his social activism in designing affordable housing. He was a mentor to many of Black architects, including two of his own daughters.

Biography 
Charles Francis McAfee was born on December 25, 1932 in Los Angeles, California, to parents Willie Anna (née Brown) and Arthur James McAfee. He served with United States Army from 1953 to 1955, during the end of the Korean War and was sent to Germany. McAfee graduated with a B.Arch in 1958 from University of Nebraska–Lincoln. In 1955, he married childhood friend and singer, Gloria Myrth Winston.

In 1963, McAfee began his own firm in Wichita, named Charles F. McAfee Architects, Engineers and Planners; the firm grew and opened satellite offices in Dallas and Atlanta. McAfee was known for his modernist designs. He tackled social inequalities with a focus on designing affordable housing and utilized a modular approach. In order to build the modular building components, Mc Afee opened a manufacturing plant in 1994 that hired and trained people from the community. In 1999, the manufacturing plant was shut down after facing debt. 

In 1976, he served as president of the National Organization of Minority Architects (NOMA). In 1981, McAfee was elected to the Fellow of the American Institute of Architects (FAIA). His awards include the Whitney M. Young Jr. Award (1999) by the American Institute of Architects at the AIA National Convention and Expo in Dallas, Texas. His archived papers are at the University of Kansas.

In 2006, the architecture firm transitioned ownership to his daughters. His daughters Cheryl Lynn McAfee Mitchell, and Charyl Frena McAfee-Duncan are also notable architects and serve in leadership positions at McAfee Architects in Atlanta. In 2020, the Wichita McAdams Park Pool was renamed the McAfee Pool in his honor.

Works 
 R. A. Eubanks residence (1964), 1436 North Madison Avenue, Wichita, Kansas
 Jackson Mortuary (1965), 600 North Main Street, Wichita, Kansas
 McAdams Park pool (1969), Wichita, Kansas
 McKnight Art Center (1970), Wichita State University, Wichita, Kansas
 Edwin A. Ulrich Museum (1974), Wichita State University, Wichita, Kansas
 Midtown station (MARTA) (1982), Atlanta, Georgia 
 1996 Olympic Games (1996), Atlanta, Georgia
 McAdams Park concession stand and restrooms (2016), Wichita, Kansas
 Oklahoma City School District 89 renovation, Oklahoma City, Oklahoma
 Calvary Baptist Church, Wichita, Kansas

See also 
 African-American architects
 McKissack & McKissack

References 

1932 births
Living people
African-American architects
20th-century American architects
People from Wichita, Kansas
University of Nebraska–Lincoln alumni
American manufacturing businesspeople
American housing activists
Fellows of the American Institute of Architects
People from Los Angeles